Stereotypes of Jews in literature have evolved over the centuries.  According to Louis Harap, nearly all European writers prior to the twentieth century projected the Jewish stereotypes in their works.  Harap cites Gotthold Lessing's Nathan the Wise (1779) as the first time that Jews were portrayed in the arts as "human beings, with human possibilities and characteristics."  Harap writes that, the persistence of the Jewish stereotype over the centuries suggests to some that "the treatment of the Jew in literature was completely static and was essentially unaffected by the changes in the Jewish situation in society as that society itself changed."  He contrasts the opposing views presented in the two most comprehensive studies of the Jew in English literature, one by Montagu Frank Modder and the other by Edgar Rosenberg.  Modder asserts that writers invariably "reflect the attitude of contemporary society in their presentation of the Jewish character, and that the portrayal changes with the economic and social changes of each decade."  In opposition to Modder's "historical rationale", Rosenberg warns that such a perspective "is apt to slight the massive durability of a stereotype". Harap suggests that the recurrence of the Jewish stereotype in literature is itself one indicator of the continued presence of anti-Semitism amongst the readers of that literature.

English literature
Edgar Rosenberg, American film and television producer, has characterized 'the image of the Jew in English literature' as having been "a depressingly uniform and static phenomenon".  For example, although Jews were expelled from England in 1290, stereotypes were so ingrained and so durable that they persisted in English society as evidenced by presentations in English literature, drama, and the visual arts during the almost four-hundred-year period when there were virtually no Jews present in the British Isles.  Dik Van Arkel notes that "Chaucer, Marlowe and Shakespeare had no direct knowledge of Jews."

The Canterbury Tales

In The Canterbury Tales, the Prioress tells a story of a devout Christian child who was murdered by Jews affronted at his singing a hymn as he passed through the Jewry, or Jewish quarter, of a city in Asia.  Much later criticism focuses on the tale's antisemitism.  Allen Koretsky asserts that, because the antisemitism in this tale runs counter to the generally positive image of Chaucer, it has been "ignored, excused, explained or palliated in a number of ways."
Thus, a considerable body of critical and scholarly opinion holds that this speech, in the mouth of the Prioress, represents an ironic inversion of Chaucer's own sentiments; that is, the Prioress is seen as a hypocrite whose cruelty and bigotry belies her conventionally pious pose—a situation typical of the indeterminacy of Chaucer's intentions.

Elizabethan era

The character of Barabas in Christopher Marlowe's play The Jew of Malta is possibly the first ever stage-portrayal of a psychopath (at least within English literature).  Barabas takes people into confidence by playing on their desires and then killing them. Like Shakespeare's Shylock—the idea of whom may have been inspired by Barabas—he is open to interpretation as a symbol of antisemitism.  However, also like Shylock, he occasionally shows evidence of humanity (albeit very rarely).

It has been suggested that The Jew of Malta influenced Shakespeare's play, The Merchant of Venice.  Despite the fact that Shakespeare probably never met a Jew,  The Merchant of Venice includes a character named Shylock who has become the archetype of the Jewish moneylender stereotype.  Derek Cohen asserts that the Shylock character is "the best known Jew in English."

Shylock is a money-lender and was often portrayed with a hooked nose and bright red wigs.  Shylock's character has been criticized for its antisemitic nature, although some interpretations of the play consider him a sympathetic figure.

Victorian era
When Jews are found in Victorian fiction, they are almost always portrayed as a stereotype rather than as human beings.

The "villain Jew" stereotype is found in a number of Victorian era novels. The character of Fagin from Charles Dickens's Oliver Twist is perhaps one of the best known Jewish stereotypes in the world. Dickens portrays him as immoral, miserly, and "disgusting" to look at.  Another famous example is the character of Svengali in George du Maurier's novel Trilby. 
Some authors of this period seem to have attempted to counterbalance the negative portrayals of Jews in their earlier works with more positive images in later works. For example, in the novel Our Mutual Friend, Dickens presents the Jewish character Riah as a paragon of virtue. Dickens even claimed that Fagin's Jewishness was incidental to the conception of the character and this claim has been treated seriously by many literary critics. In opposition to this view, Cohen and Heller assert that Fagin's Jewishness is stressed frequently in Oliver Twist and that Dickens often refers to him as "the Jew" and that Fagin's character and physical features draw on the "long history of antisemitic associations and stereotypes to provide added resonance to Fagin's particular villainies".

George du Maurier depicts Svengali as a Jewish rogue, masterful musician, and hypnotist. The character has been portrayed in many film and television versions of the story.  The word "svengali" has entered the language meaning a person who with evil intent manipulates another into doing what is desired. It is frequently used for any kind of coach who seems to exercise an extreme degree of domination over a performer (especially if the person is a young woman and the coach is an older man).

One notable exception is the character of Anton Trendelssohn in his novel Nina Balatka, whom Anthony Trollope portrays as a more deep character rather than as a Jewish stereotype.

George Eliot's novel Daniel Deronda (1876) is admired by many for having made an honest attempt to capture the essence of 19th century Judaism by  presenting a sympathetic rendering of Jewish proto-Zionist and Kaballistic ideas,

20th century

Negative stereotypes of Jews were still employed by prominent twentieth-century non-Jewish writers such as Dorothy Richardson, Virginia Woolf, T. S. Eliot, Evelyn Waugh, and Graham Greene.

The protagonist in James Joyce's Ulysses, Leopold Bloom, is probably one of the most remarkable representations of Jews in Irish fiction. Bloom is the quintessential Everyman, and takes on the venerable role of Odysseus in Joyce's saga. Far from stereotypical, the depiction of his personality is one of the most detailed in literature.

Ezra Pound mentions Jewish attitudes towards money in his poem The Cantos, which focuses on the themes of economics and governance.   In the poem, Jews are implicated in sinister manipulations of the money supply.    Abraham Foxman asserts that The Cantos include a "vicious diatribe against interest-paying finance" and that those sections include antisemitic passages.   In Canto 52, Pound wrote "Stinkschuld's [Rothschilds] sin drawing vengeance, poor yitts paying for / Stinkschuld [Rothschilds] / paying for a few big jews' vendetta on goyim", but the name Rothschilds was replaced by "Stinkschulds" at the insistence of Pound's publisher.

American literature
Until the 20th century, the characterization of Jews in American literature was largely based upon the stereotypes employed in English literature.
Although Jewish stereotypes first appeared in works by non-Jewish writers, after World War II it was often Jewish American writers themselves who evoked such fixed images. The prevalence of anti-Semitic stereotypes in the works of such authors has sometimes been interpreted an expression of self-hatred; however, Jewish American authors have also used these negative stereotypes in order to refute them.

19th century

Anti-Semitic images are often found in nineteenth-century American literature.  Some of the most notorious examples can be found in the writings of Nathaniel Hawthorne.  In Hawthorne's novel The Marble Faun, Jews are described as "the ugliest, most evil-minded people" who resemble "maggots when they overpopulate a decaying cheese."

The earliest significant American poets were the Fireside Poets.  These wrote from a Christian point of view and, with the exception of John Greenleaf Whittier, uniformly employed negative stereotypes of Jews.

In the latter half of the 19th century, Jews were often characterized as overly ambitious compared to African-Americans and Native Americans.  Anti-Jewish stereotypes portrayed Jews as "aggressively smart and threateningly successful"; they were seen as a threat to American culture because of their "rapid social and economic mobility".  However, despite their economic success, Jews were depicted as being unable to assimilate into American culture.  One focus of media attention was the Lower East Side of Manhattan, an area where many European Jewish immigrants had settled.  Newspaper accounts and photographs of the time depicted this urban slum as cluttered, disorderly, dirty and smelly; in brief, the living conditions of the Jews were considered to violate middle-class white standards of cleanliness and orderliness.  Alicia Kent notes that, although the photographs of Jacob Riis were motivated by a desire to reform immigrant housing and employment conditions, they ironically helped to fix the public perception of Jews as "disorderly and uncontrollable."

Perhaps the only major work of 19th-century American literature that does not depict Jews according to the stereotypes of the day is Herman Melville's epic poem Clarel, which depicts the hardships faced by Jews living in Palestine as well as their customs.  Departing from the usual treatment employed by other American writers of that era, Melville presents a range of Jewish characters that provide the reader a sense of Jews as human individuals rather than as cardboard cutouts.

20th century
The presentation of economic and social stereotypes of Jews in American literature persisted into the first half of the 20th century.  Jews were depicted as money-obsessed, vulgar, and pushy social climbers.  Jewish men and women were represented in literature as dressing ostentatiously.  Their physical characteristics followed the model that had been handed down over the centuries: Red hair and hooked noses were some of the prominent features employed.  For example, in The American Scene, Henry James employs a number of anti-Semitic stereotypes to describe the skin color and nose shape of the Jewish residents.   Characterization of Jews as an inferior race could be found in works such as Jack London's novel Martin Eden.

Jewish-American authors
According to Sanford V. Sternlicht, the first generation of Jewish-American authors presented "realistic portrayals - warts and all" of Jewish immigrants.  He describes the literature of this generation as "almost devoid of Jewish self-hatred."  Sternlicht contrasts this generation with some second or third-generation Jewish-American authors who deliberately "reinforced negative stereotypes with satire and a selective realism".

The Jewish-American Princess (JAP) stereotype was a construct of, and popularized by, post-war Jewish male writers, notably in Herman Wouk's 1955 novel, Marjorie Morningstar and Philip Roth's 1959 novel Goodbye, Columbus featuring princess protagonists.

French literature

Medieval era
In medieval French literature, Jews are generally presented unfavorably.  However, those Jews who convert are treated favorably. For example, a Jew who is among the infidels who convert is viewed positively in the 12th-century Pèlerinage de Charlemagne a Jérusalem (Pilgrimage of Charlemagne to Jerusalem). A rare exception to the unfavorable stereotyping of Jews is a work by Peter Abelard framed as a dialogue between a Jewish and a Christian philosopher and presents Judaism in a favorable light.

18th century
Although Voltaire was celebrated for his commitment to tolerance, his writings often included vicious stereotypes of traditional targets of prejudice such as Jews and Catholics.  Discussing Voltaire's literary treatment of Jews in works such as Candide, Eric Palmer describes him as having been "uncharacteristically blind to some forms of inhumanity within his sphere."  Robert Michael writes that, "Voltaire's work helped ensure that antisemitic stereotypes would persist among the educated members of French society."
In his 1759 novel Candide, Voltaire utilizes stereotypical characterization of Jews as greedy and dishonest.  For example, Cunegonde is sold to a Jewish merchant:

19th century
Nineteenth-century French literature is filled with both pro-Jewish and anti-Jewish images.  Some of the anti-Jewish images include stereotypes such as the greedy banker and art collector in Honoré de Balzac's series La Comédie humaine (The Human Comedy).  Henry H. Weinberg has described the stereotype of the Jewish banker in late nineteenth-century French literature as "shifty, cosmopolitan, cleverly manipulating ... single-minded [in his] quest for money."  In George Sand's drama Les Mississipiens (1866), there is a Jewish capitalist, Samuel Bourset, who has been described as a "Shylock in modern dress".

German literature

High German literature

In the first published version of the Faust legend – the anonymous Faustbuch of 1587 – Faust borrows money from a Jew, who demands one of Faust's legs as security for the debt. Faust saws off his leg and gives it to the Jew as collateral; however, when Faust subsequently returns to repay the debt, the Jew is, of course, unable to return the leg and compelled to pay Faust compensation as a result.

19th century
The hostility towards Jews that developed in the political and cultural arenas of 19th-century German society was reflected in the literature of the era.  
The "Orientalness of Jews", particularly that of Jewish women, was a common trope in anti-Semitic German literature of the 19th century. Examples of this stereotype are found in Hauff's novella Jud Süß (1827), Hebbel's play Judith (1840) and Grillparzer's play Die Jüdin von Toledo (1872).

Another stereotype of Jews employed in German literature was to represent them as speaking in a manner that was considered defective German. This manner of speech was referred to as mauscheln, a German word based on the proper name Moishe. An example of this stereotype is the character of Jäkel the Fool who speaks in a "mock Frankfurt accent dialect" that is meant to be understood as proto-Yiddish.

Richard Levy characterizes Veitel Itzig, the villain in Gustav Freytag's Debit and Credit as "perhaps the most poisonous stereotype of the greedy, utterly immoral Jewish businessman in nineteenth-century literature."  According to Jacob Katz, the message of Debit and Credit is that "Judaism alone is not capable of giving its adherents morality or culture."

Post-World War II
Since the end of World War II, negative stereotypes of the Jew have almost totally disappeared from German literature.  The awareness of German crimes against Jews and the contribution of anti-Semitism in German literature to the ethos in which those crimes were committed have led postwar authors to work towards providing a more accurate and unbiased portrayal of the Jewish experience.

Russian literature

Russian literature has a long tradition of negative Jewish stereotypes. Zvi Y. Gitelman writes that "Whatever their personal views of the Jewish people, pre-1881 Russian writers fell short of their liberal, humanistic ideals when they wrote of Jews."

"The author and the work most often attacked for creating an disseminating such stereotypes was Faddey Vanediktovich Bulgarin and his picaresque novel Ivan Vyzhigin. In chapter seven of this popular novel, Bulgarin's hero Ivan encounters the dishonest village tavern keeper Movsha and his wife Rifka and chronicles the endless dishonesty of these" Jewish characters. Although Bulgarin was a convenient scapegoat for perpetuating these stereotypes, "few Russian authors of his age, including the 'classics', avoided crude Jewish stereotypes. Nikolay Gogol's" "Yankel' in Taras Bulba lacked the malevolence of Bulgarin's Movsha, but he and other Jews are usually portrayed as ridiculous and bizarre." "One of the most repellent literary Jewish types of this period was to be found in Ivan Turgenev's early story Zhid. Despite sympathetic nuances, Dostoyevsky's Jewish convict Bumschteyn in Notes from the House of the Dead is a stereotyped character."

See also

Racial stereotypes
Stereotypes of Jews

References

Sources

Further reading

Craig, Terrence: Racial Attitudes in English-Canadian Fiction, 1905-1980. xii, 163 pp. Waterloo, Ont.: Wilfrid Laurier University Press, 1987.

Wassermann, Henry: Stereotypes and Antisemitism, from the Middle Ages to the Present. 23 pp.  Jerusalem: Israel Information Centre, 1985. ("Da et amcha"). (Hebrew)

 
Literature
Jewish portrayals in media